Shiwar village is located in Chauth Ka Barwara tehsil of Sawai Madhopur district, Rajasthan, India.

Here is the ancient grand temple of Ghushmeshwar, the last Jyotirlinga of Lord Shiva.

References

Villages in Sawai Madhopur district